Leucoptera loxaula is a moth in the family Lyonetiidae. It is known from South Africa and Zimbabwe.

The larvae feed on Pavetta assimilis.

References

Leucoptera (moth)
Moths described in 1928
Moths of Sub-Saharan Africa
Lepidoptera of Zimbabwe
Lepidoptera of South Africa